The 1995 Winter European Youth Olympic Winter Days was an international multi-sport event held between 4 and 10 February 1995, in Andorra la Vella, Andorra.

Sports

Medalists

Alpine skiing

Cross-country skiing

Figure skating

Short track speed skating

Medal table

External links
 Results

European Youth Olympic Winter Festival
European Youth Olympic Winter Festival
European Youth Olympic Winter Festival
European Youth Olympic Winter Festival
International sports competitions hosted by Andorra
Youth sport in Andorra
1995 in youth sport
February 1995 sports events in Europe
Sports competitions in Andorra la Vella